This is a list of characters appearing in In the Night Garden....

Main
 Igglepiggle (played by Nick Kellington) is a blue teddy bear-like creature with a bean-shaped head, a doll-like nose, a sideways red mohawk and average-sized legs. He always carries his red blanket and tends to fall flat on his back when surprised. He is the main character of the show. He arrives in the Night Garden at the beginning of each episode and leaves the Night Garden at the end of each episode in a boat-like bed for himself, for which the blanket doubles and serves as a sail. Igglepiggle does not speak, but he has a bell in his left foot, a squeaker in his tummy and a rattle in his left hand. His best friends in the garden are Upsy Daisy, the Tombliboos and Makka Pakka. He is the only character not to sleep in the show (with one exception and apart from one time when he fell and fell asleep on Upsy Daisy's Bed) because he sometimes needs to find his boat; he sleeps on his boat instead of in a bed. He is the only character to walk on the Stepping Stone Path and in the Garden and the only character to ride in two carriages of the Ninky Nonk. Igglepiggle is not a native of the Garden but a tourist. He was first featured in the episode "Makka Pakka Washes Faces", his song was "Yes My Name is Igglepiggle", which had the same tune as the show's theme. He is similar to Tinky Winky From Teletubbies.
 Upsy Daisy (played by Rebecca Hyland) is a rag doll-like creature, with a brown skin colour, a chime in her tummy and brightly coloured clothes. She likes walking through the Garden and blowing kisses on the other characters or the audience. She often hugs and kisses other characters, particularly Igglepiggle. Her catchphrases are "Upsy Daisy" and the more emphatic "Daisy Doo!" and she additionally says "Pip pip onk onk!", her way of saying goodbye. Her hair stands on end when excited or surprised and her skirt inflates to a tutu when she dances or pulls the ripcord on her waist. In Davenport's earliest sketch of the character, her face was more of a flower-like shape. She, along with Igglepiggle, was first featured in the episode "Makka Pakka Washes Faces" and pulls the ripcord on her waist in "Makka Pakka's Trumpet Makes A Funny Noise". She has a reprise song in "The Ninky Nonk Wants a Kiss", also she loves to sing, usually, when she kisses Igglepiggle, Igglepiggle kisses back. Her song was "Upsy Daisy Here I Come". She is similar to Laa-Laa from Teletubbies.
 Makka Pakka (played by Justyn Towler) is a beige, small, round-bodied doll-like creature. He has three rounded protuberances on his head, ears and bottom back to represent stones that he uses to make piles. He lives in a rock cave and likes cleaning things, such as his collection of stacking stones and sometimes the other characters. He often stacks freshly cleaned stones into piles resembling his head and body. He sleeps in and on a brightly coloured sleeping stone bag bed, often cuddling a stone as a toy. He travels around the garden riding his trolley/scooter, the Og-Pog, which carries: his sponge, soap, red/orange trumpet and a bellows-like apparatus device called "the Uff-Uff" which he uses to dry items after cleaning them. His house is approached by a stone-walled ditch, as his home is half-buried in the ground. He says his name and the phrase "Mikka makka moo" when he is happy, as well as the names of the Og-Pog and the Uff-Uff and other phrases from his song such as "agga pang" (his soap and sponge) and "hum dum" (his trumpet) and possibly "Ing ang oo" (when he wants to blow his trumpet). Like Upsy Daisy and the Tombliboos, he also uses a phrase meaning "goodbye", represented in publications as "pip pip onk onk". He, Igglepiggle and Upsy Daisy were first featured in the episode "Makka Pakka Washes Faces". As Makka Pakka is smaller than the other characters, he is filmed on another identical set (or garden) and where he appears with other characters, two scenes are shot in parallel and he is filmed far away, whilst the other costumed characters are filmed close up. He has a reprise song in "Everybody All Aboard the Ninky Nonk", his song was "Makka Pakka Mikka Makka Moo", The song became an internet meme.
 The Tombliboos– Unn (played by Andy Wareham), Ooo (played by Isaac Blake in Season 1 and by Holly Denoon in the Season 1 finale and Season 2) and Eee (played by Elisa Laghi) – are a trio of three doll-like creatures who are all dressed in costumes with stripes and spots: red and green (Unn), brown and pink (Ooo) and yellow and pink (Eee). Their names phonetically reflect how a young child might count to three and the Tombliboos always appear in this order by saying their names. They live among the branches of a bush, playing on a series of platforms connected by stairs and chutes; the platforms occasionally tilt when the Tombliboos jump on them as seen in "The Tombliboos Clean Their Teeth". The Tombliboos enjoy playing the drums and the piano, although not with any particular musical ability and they also play with large building blocks. Their trousers (which fall down unexpectedly) are often seen hanging on the washing line outside their home and they usually take them down from the line and wear them before going out. They are sometimes seen brushing their teeth before bed. The Tombliboos enjoy kissing each other whilst cuddling and reciting their names. They also have a song about staying together, which consists of them singing "Tombliboo, Tombliboo, Unn, Ooo, Eee!" repeatedly. The Tombliboo named Eee is a female and is shorter and younger than the other two Tombliboos. Unn, Ooo and Eee are often seen sleeping in striped beds that match their overalls. The Tombliboos, along with Igglepiggle, Upsy Daisy and Makka Pakka, were first featured in the episode "Makka Pakka Washes Faces". They have a reprise song in "Trousers on the Ninky Nonk". their song was "Ombliboo Tombliboo".
The Narrator (played by Sir Derek Jacobi) is a charming voice who can often be heard describing the day-to-day activities of the Night Garden as they happen. Though they never physically appear in the show, all the other inhabitants of the Night Garden are aware of them and will usually respond whenever they speak to them. They are featured in every episode. They tell the characters what to do (e.g. telling one to go to sleep; etc.) as well as singing along to a character's song when they're introduced into the episode.
The Pontipines (red) and The Wottingers (blue) are ten tiny wooden figurine-like families (a mother and a father plus four boys and four girls). They live in a semi-detached house at the foot of a tree. The Pontipines appear in most episodes, while the Wottingers' appearances are rare.
The Haahoos are like five balloon-like creatures who roam about the garden at a leisurely pace. The purply pare Haahoo is shaped like a jelly bean or stemless pair, decorated with yellow flowers. The blue cross Haahoo has cyan spots with red outlines, and it is shaped like the letter X. The orange flower Haahoo is shaped like a flower, with multi-coloured petals. The yellow star Haahoo with red, orange and blue spots is shaped like a star. The red and blue/checkered Haahoo is ball-shaped, with checkered red and blue/white diamonds. The Haahoos appear in the main body of an episode as 10ft inflatables, but behind the gazebo during general dance sequences as CGI replicas. They are also seen going to sleep, closing their eyes and deflating slightly.
The Tittifers are a bunch of CGI-enhanced tropical birds with unique songs. There are four small blue tittifers (long-tailed finches), three larger pink ones (hoopoes), two big green ones (white-cheeked turacos) and one (Channel-billed toucan).
The Ninky Nonk is a trackless train with five differently sized and shaped carriages. Its size is non-euclidean: exterior shots of the moving Ninky Nonk show a toy-sized train, quite small compared to the main characters and scenery, while interiors and static exterior shots are done on sets or with life-sized models so that the characters can easily fit inside. When it is moving, the seat-belted passengers jerk sharply in their seats. Bells and green lights warn everyone inside when the Ninky Nonk is ready to leave. The Ninky Nonk can drive up and down trees and upside-down along branches (Mostly for the Pontipines and Wottingers). The engine is banana-shaped with a green flashing light on top and is followed by a green spheroidal carriage used by the Tombliboos and Makka Pakka, a tiny house-like carriage used by the Pontipines and Wottingers, a blue rectangular carriage used by Upsy Daisy and Igglepiggle when he is travelling with Upsy Daisy, and a tall rounded single-seater carriage used by Igglepiggle when he is travelling alone. All the carriages have lights on top that flash in sequence when the Ninky Nonk is stationary. In the episode What a Funny Ninky Nonk everybody had to run after it.
The Pinky Ponk is a kind of airship which glides gracefully in the air, providing wonderful aerial views of the garden for all those on board. It is coloured a bright turquoise and is decorated with an abundance of pink, orange and yellow speckles on each side. The "cockpit" contains multiple small tables that house pinky ponk juice for each character to drink on their journey and are surrounded by small stones acting as stools. at the front is a huge window for them to look out of and enjoy the spectacular views of the Night Garden. On the top is a tiny deck especially for the Pontipines, who access the Pinky Ponk through a tiny door and go up a lift to enter that deck. The bigger characters enter through a similarly sized door so they could get in too. On the outside are 4 rows of orange-speckled wings and tiny purple propellers to make the body afloat. The back of the vehicle houses a ginormous pink propeller in front of a back deck where the passengers can get some fresh air. At the front is a transparent magenta light that is triggered when the Pinky Ponk is about to take off, land, or, well, ponk.

References

In The Night Garden